Hotel desk may refer to:
 Hot desking
 The front desk for the receptionist at a hotel